The Consensus 1995 College Basketball All-American team, as determined by aggregating the results of four major All-American teams.  To earn "consensus" status, a player must win honors from a majority of the following teams: the Associated Press, the USBWA, The United Press International and the National Association of Basketball Coaches.

1995 Consensus All-America team

Individual All-America teams

AP Honorable Mention

Mario Bennett, Arizona State
Travis Best, Georgia Tech
Junior Burrough, Virginia
Marcus Camby, Massachusetts
Dan Cross, Florida
Erick Dampier, Mississippi State
Tony Delk, Kentucky
Tyus Edney, UCLA
Michael Finley, Wisconsin
Alan Henderson, Indiana
Fred Hoiberg, Iowa State
Allen Iverson, Georgetown
Tom Kleinschmidt, DePaul
Donny Marshall, Connecticut
Cuonzo Martin, Purdue
Ryan Minor, Oklahoma
Steve Nash, Santa Clara
Greg Ostertag, Kansas
Cherokee Parks, Duke
Terrence Rencher, Texas
Bob Sura, Florida State
Scotty Thurman, Arkansas
Gary Trent, Ohio
Keith Van Horn, Utah
Jacque Vaughn, Kansas

References

NCAA Men's Basketball All-Americans
All-Americans